Produce 48 – Final is an extended play by contestants of the South Korean survival show Produce 48. It was released as a digital album on September 1, 2018, by Stone Music Entertainment.

Background and release 
Produce 48 was a South Korean survival show that aired on Mnet from June 15, 2018, to August 31, 2018, where 96 trainees from various entertainment companies competed to debut in a 12-member girl group, which would promote for two and a half years.

The EP was released as a digital album through several music portals, including MelOn and iTunes.

Commercial performance 
The songs failed to enter the main chart on the Gaon Digital Chart, but three songs debuted on the componing Download Chart on the week ending September 1: "Yume wo Miteiru Aida (Korean Ver.)" at number 80, "We Together" at 94 and "Suki ni Nacchau Daro?" at 96. In a second week, "Suki ni Nacchau Daro?" peaked at number 91, meanwhile "Yume wo Miteiru Aida (Korean Ver.)" placed at number 89 and "We Together" at 95.

Track listing

References 

Produce 101
2018 compilation albums